"Help Me" is a love song written, produced, and performed by Joni Mitchell and released on her 1974 album Court and Spark. The song was recorded with jazz band Tom Scott's L.A. Express as the backing band.

"Help Me" was Mitchell's biggest hit single, her only Top 10 hit. It peaked at #7 in June 1974 on the Billboard Hot 100, and it hit #1 on the easy listening chart.

Lyrics and music
Billboard described the lyrics as Mitchell singing of "needing help to feel good."

In the lyrics, the singer makes a plea for help that, in later lines, seems a bit of a dichotomy.  She knows she's falling in love with "a rambler and a gambler and a sweet-talking ladies' man."   But apparently, she has no intention to break things off, even though the last line of each chorus cynically says "We love our loving, but not like we love our freedom." This can be applied to both the singer and her object of affection, a reflection on 1970s outlooks on the challenges of a relationship without boundaries.

Personnel

 Joni Mitchell – vocals, acoustic guitar, piano; producer
 Tom Scott – woodwinds, reeds
 Joe Sample – electric piano
 Larry Carlton – electric guitar
 Max Bennett – bass guitar
 John Guerin – drums, percussion
 Henry Lewy and Ellis Sorkin – engineers

Critical reception
The song is ranked #288 on Rolling Stone magazine's list of the 500 Greatest Songs of All Time.

Covers
Artists who have recorded cover versions of the song include:
 Wynonna (on the 2000 album New Day Dawning)
 Mandy Moore (on her 2003 covers album Coverage)
 Karrin Allyson on her 2004 album Wild For You.
 Divine Brown (on her 2005 self-titled album)
 k.d. lang (on the 2007 tribute album A Tribute to Joni Mitchell)
 Katharine McPhee (on the iTunes deluxe edition of her 2010 album Unbroken)
 Will Young (recorded live in London as the B-side to his 2009 single Let It Go)
 Judy Kuhn (on her 2013 album All This Happiness)
 Chaka Khan (on the 2019 live tribute album Joni 75: A Birthday Celebration)

In popular culture
The Prince song "Ballad of Dorothy Parker" (from his 1987 album Sign o' the Times) mentions the song in the lyrics: "..and it was Joni singing: ‘Help me, I think I'm falling’."  A sample can also be heard in "Looking Through Patient Eyes" by P.M. Dawn.

In the show South Park, the character Butters briefly sings this song in Season 11/Episode 2  ("Cartman Sucks"). In the Season 6 of the TV series Shameless, the main character Frank Gallagher and his lover Queenie sing the first half of the song during breakfast.

Charts

Weekly charts

Year-end charts

See also
List of number-one adult contemporary singles of 1974 (U.S.)

References

1974 singles
Joni Mitchell songs
Songs written by Joni Mitchell
1973 songs
Asylum Records singles
Song recordings produced by Joni Mitchell
Mandy Moore songs